Herbert Felix Farnworth (born 23 December 1999) is an English professional rugby league footballer who plays as a  for the Brisbane Broncos in the NRL and England at international level.

Background
Farnworth was born in Blacko, Lancashire, England. Farnworth was a talented association football player as a youth and was part of the Manchester United development system before turning to rugby league. 

"I was with Burnley to start with and then I signed with Man United, I used to score bare screamers. I signed there for two years as a young fella of 10 and 11 and I'd go to camps and train with them," Farnworth said. "I was either a centre-midfielder or left wing. Then I had a talks with Manchester City but I wanted to focus on my rugby league."

While still a pupil at Ermysted's Grammar School and playing for Wigan St Patricks and Newton Storm he was spotted by scouts for Brisbane Broncos and after leaving school he moved to Australia. He played  as a junior.

Career

Early career
Farnworth played for the Brisbane Broncos Holden Cup team in 2017, playing 17 games and scoring 8 tries.

In 2018, with the Holden Cup ceasing, Farnworth graduated to the Queensland Cup with Norths Devils playing 9 games, scoring 4 tries and kicking 9 goals.

2019
Farnworth made his debut in Round 16 of the 2019 NRL season for Brisbane against the Cronulla-Sutherland Sharks.

Farnworth finished with 2 NRL games played while he played for Broncos feeder club, Norths Devils ending the season as the team's top scorer and third overall in the Intrust Super Cup competition scoring 204 points (20 tries, 62 goals).

2020
Farnworth played 19 games and scored six tries for Brisbane in the 2020 NRL season as the club finished last on the table and claimed their first wooden spoon.

Farnworth was awarded Brisbane's Rookie of The Year award.

2021
In Round 23 or the 2021 NRL season, Farnworth kicked four goals from four attempts, leading the Broncos to a 24-22 win over the New Zealand Warriors, ending their finals hopes.  

Farnworth won Brisbane's Allan Langer Award as their Best Back of The Year.

2022
In round 2 of the 2022 NRL season, Farnworth scored two tries in a 16-10 victory over Canterbury at Stadium Australia.
In round 14, Farnworth scored two tries for Brisbane in a 24-18 victory over Canberra but was taken from the field in the second half with a suspected bicep injury.
On 15 October, Farnworth made his England debut against Samoa in the 2021 Rugby League World Cup scoring one try as England won the match 60-6.
On 12 November, Farnworth scored two tries for England in their 27-26 semi-final loss to Samoa at the Emirates Stadium.

2023
On 24 February, Farnworth signed a three-year deal to join the newly admitted Dolphins team starting in 2024.
In round 1 of the 2023 NRL season, Farnworth scored two tries for Brisbane as they pulled off a massive upset defeating back to back premiers Penrith at Penrith Stadium 13-12.

Honours
Individual
 Brisbane Broncos Rookie of The Year: 2020
 Brisbane Broncos 'Allan Langer Award' Best Back: 2021

References

External links
Brisbane Broncos profile
Norths Devils profile
England profile

1999 births
Living people
Brisbane Broncos players
England national rugby league team players
English expatriate rugby league players
English rugby league players
Norths Devils players
People educated at Ermysted's Grammar School
People from Barrowford
Rugby league players from Burnley
Rugby league wingers